The Type 77 heavy machine gun or Type 85 is a Chinese 12.7×108mm heavy machine gun featuring an indigenous design.

History
During the mid-1970s, China decided to develop a lighter 12.7 mm machine gun to replace the Type 54 (indigenous DShK) that was more suited for mobile anti-aircraft applications. The weapon was adopted in 1977 and mass production commenced in 1980. To save weight the Type 77 used a hybrid  short-recoil and direct gas impingement operated action, somewhat unusual for a machine gun, resulting in few moving parts and a long and slim, tubular receiver. Overall weight of the gun and tripod comes to about 56 kg (120 lb), less than half that of a mounted Type 54/DShK, though it retains the same locking system and belt feed. 

The barrel is also thinner as light weight was favored over volume of fire, which causes it to overheat faster, with a prominent "pepperpot" muzzle brake. It has iron sights and a mount for a low-magnification optical sight suitable for engaging ground and air targets. The gun also has a large charging handle below the receiver, shoulder stock, and fires from an open bolt.

Variants

Type 85 heavy machine gun
Military designation QJG-85. Five years after the Type 77 entered service, it was replaced in production by the updated Type 85 heavy machine gun. An evolution on the Type 77, it used a more conventional muzzle brake and replaced the spade grips and separate cocking handle with horizontal grips and a sliding trigger unit, the entirety of which is moved forward and back to cock the gun. The gun and tripod were also lighter, weighing  and  respectively. Both weapons can be mounted on vehicles.

Users

 Iraqi security forces: Used by Unmanned ground vehicle "Alrobot". Also used by the Popular Mobilization Forces.

Non-State Actors
 Free Syrian Army and Turkish-backed Free Syrian Army

 People's Movement for the Liberation of Azawad
 Tigray Defense Forces

See also
 QJG-02
 QJC-88
 QJY-89
 DShK
 NSV
 M2 Browning
 Kord machine gun

References

Cold War weapons of China
Machine guns of the People's Republic of China
Heavy machine guns
12.7×108 mm machine guns
Military equipment introduced in the 1970s